Eshab-ı Kehf Cave, also known as Ashab-ı Kehf Cave or Seven Sleepers' Cave, (Ashab-ı Kehf Mağarası or Yedi Uyurlar Mağarası) is a show cave situated to the north of Tarsus, an ilçe (district) in Mersin Province, Turkey. The cave is named after the Persian word اصحاب کهف ("Ashāb-i Kahf") itself from the Arabic "aṣḥāb al kahf", "people of the cave", for Seven Sleepers of Ephesus, a belief in Christian and Islamic tradition.

It is at the foothill of a small hill. The cave is small, not comparable to other caves of the province. However, it is a famed to be the cave of the Seven Sleepers. The exact location of the Seven Sleepers' cave is not known, and there are many other places including some in Turkey claiming to be the cave of the Seven Sleepers. Next to the cave, there is a mosque commissioned by the Ottoman sultan Abdülaziz (reigned 1861–1876), and built in 1873. The mosque's tall minaret with three şerefes (balconies) were added later. 

The other probable locations of the Seven Sleepers in Turkey are:
Ephesus in İzmir Province
Lice in Diyarbakır Province
Afşin in Kahramanmaraş Province (see Eshab-ı Kehf Kulliye)

References

Show caves in Turkey
Landforms of Mersin Province
Tarsus, Mersin
Tourist attractions in Mersin Province